Howard Mann (June 20, 1923 – September 18, 2008) was an American actor and comedian. Mann appeared on television, film and commercials during his 40-year-long career in the entertainment industry. Some of his most recent roles in the 2000s included Pushing Daisies and The Starter Wife. Despite his dozens of film and television credits in his resume, Mann wrote that he had "probably been turned down more times than a blanket," in a guest column in the Los Angeles Times in 2006.

Early life 
Mann was born Howard Mendelsohn in 1923 in New York City. He graduated from the City College of New York and studied acting and comedy with Zero Mostel, Herbert Berghof, and William Hickey.

Career 
Mann began his career in entertainment as a comedian after being laid off from his job as an advertising copywriter. Mann began performing in the Jewish entertainers circuit in resorts in New York's Borscht Belt region in the Catskill Mountains. His dozens of television appearances included Laverne & Shirley, Alice, Moonlighting and Murder, She Wrote. His film credits included Mr. Saturday Night in 1992 and the History of the World: Part I in 1981. Mann also appeared on the Merv Griffin Show and The Tonight Show Starring Johnny Carson. On stage, Mann toured the United States in a one-man show, in which he played George Washington, in 1976 in honor of the United States Bicentennial. He later portrayed the role of Oscar Madison in an off Broadway production of The Odd Couple. Beginning in the 1980s, Mann created and performed an original rap routine for senior citizens living in the San Fernando Valley.

Personal life 
Mann died of cancer on September 18, 2008, at Cedars-Sinai Medical Center in Los Angeles at the age of 85. He was survived by his longtime girlfriend and companion, Bea Mitz.

Filmography

Film

Television

References

External links 
 Variety Magazine: Comic, actor Howard Mann dies
 

1923 births
2008 deaths
American male comedians
20th-century American comedians
American male television actors
American male stage actors
American male film actors
20th-century American male actors
City College of New York alumni